The Muttereralmbahn is an aerial tramway in Mutters, Tyrol, Austria.

In 1954, the first cable car leading from Mutters to the popular Mutterer Alm ski resort was opened.  This facility, known for its characteristic egg-shaped cabins, was shut down in 2000.

A new aerial tramway with 8-person cabins was opened on January 5, 2006.

External links
 Official site: http://www.muttereralm.info
 Historical photos
 Photos of the original (pre-2000) cars

Cable cars in Austria
Transport in Tyrol (state)
1954 establishments in Austria
20th-century architecture in Austria